The Easter Group is the central of three groups of islands that make up the Houtman Abrolhos island chain. The group measures about 20 kilometres by 12 kilometres, and consists of a number of islands including

 Rat Island
 Wooded Island
 Morley Island
 Suomi Island 
 Alexander Island. 
Unlike the other groups the Easter Group has few shipwrecks.  The group is part of the Houtman Abrolhos Important Bird Area, identified as such by BirdLife International because of its importance for supporting large numbers of breeding seabirds.

The group was discovered and named in April 1840 by the crew of HMS Beagle, under the command of John Clements Wickham. Stoke's journal, published as Discoveries in Australia in 1846, records the following for April 11:

See also
 Wallabi Group
 Pelsaert Group
 List of islands of Western Australia

References

Further reading
, (Report number 66) with contribution from Ross White, Jenni Potts  and Caroline Heine.

 
Important Bird Areas of Western Australia
Islands of the Houtman Abrolhos